Latrigg is one of the lowest fells in the Lake District in North West England, but is a popular climb due to its convenient location overlooking the town of Keswick and the beautiful views down the valley of Borrowdale from the summit. It is the least mountainous of the Skiddaw fells, the summit being almost entirely devoid of rock. The slopes of Latrigg are partially wooded, and logging work is currently being undertaken. One lone tree just south of the summit is prominently viewed in silhouette when approaching Keswick from the west along the A66. It also has petrified trees on top.

Topography

Latrigg is the most southerly top of the Skiddaw massif and of the Northern Fells as a whole. It takes the form of a rounded hump at the terminus of a long descending ridge, and would be unremarkable if not for its location. Latrigg itself sends out a narrow ridge to the east, about a mile long and ending at Brundholm.

The fell is bordered by the two streams falling from the northern col. Gale Gill runs west to join the River Derwent between Derwentwater and Bassenthwaite Lake. The unnamed eastern stream joins Whit Beck and then flows into the River Greta, bound again for the Derwent via Keswick.

The steep southern slopes are cloaked in the mixed woodland of Brundholme Wood and Whinny Brow, Latrigg's only crags being hidden in the trees. Further mixed woodland has been planted on the north eastern slopes above Whit Beck. To the north west, on either bank of Gale Gill, are the conifer plantations of Birkett Wood and Mallen Dodd. A single track road climbs up the slope beside the wood, giving access to a car park on the depression to the north of the fell.

Geology
In common with much of the Northern Fells the Kirk Stile Formation of the Skiddaw Group predominates. This is composed of laminated mudstone and siltstone with greywacke sandstone and is of Ordovician age. Two rock-slope failures exist on the southern slopes of Latrigg northeast of Keswick.

Summit

The top of the fell is sheep pasture, falling gently to the north and quite steeply to the south. Some stumps remain at the top of the southern slope as evidence of past deforestation, together with few small trees, bent down by the prevailing wind. A ditch and parapet run across the top. The parapet was the base of a fence, long since decayed, and the ditch was the source of the earth for its construction.

The view northward is of the high grassy flanks of Skiddaw and Blencathra, impressive but lacking detail. To the south the contrast is total. Looking out over Keswick and down the full length of Derwentwater, the eye is drawn to Borrowdale and the high fells of Central Lakeland. Wainwright was moved to describe "a panorama of crowded detail, all of it of great beauty: indeed this scene is one of the gems of the district...The far horizon is a jumbled upheaval of peaks, with many dear old friends standing up proudly."

Computer generated summit panorama.

Atop the summit, is a distinctive tree known as The Witch, given its shape which resembles a person riding a broomstick.

Ascents

Commonly Latrigg is ascended from Keswick, the route beginning along Spooney Green Lane near the old railway station and then either making direct for the top or swinging north via Mallen Dodd. Threlkeld is another starting point, first crossing the Glenderaterra Beck and then climbing up the east ridge. The easiest way is to park at the end of Gale Road, from where the summit is a simple 10‑minute stroll on grass, the most accessible of all the 214 Wainwrights. This car park is commonly used as the starting point for the ascent of Skiddaw, although the purist will first climb Latrigg from Keswick before setting foot upon its parent. A recently constructed path allows disabled access to the summit of Latrigg from the car park.

Gallery

References

Lake District Walks - Latrigg Walk
 Complete Lakeland Fells, Bill Birkett, 

Fells of the Lake District